The 2015 Big South Conference men's soccer tournament was the 32nd edition of the tournament. It determined the Big South Conference's automatic berth into the 2015 NCAA Division I Men's Soccer Championship.

The Winthrop Eagles won the tournament, besting the High Point Panthers in the championship match.

Qualification 

The top eight teams in the Big South Conference based on their conference regular season records qualified for the tournament.

Bracket

Schedule

Quarterfinals

Semifinals

Championship

Statistical leaders

Top goalscorers

Tournament Best XI

See also 
 Big South Conference
 2015 Big South Conference men's soccer season
 2015 NCAA Division I men's soccer season
 2015 NCAA Division I Men's Soccer Championship

References 

2015
Big South Conference Men's Soccer Tournament
Big South Conference Men's Soccer Tournament